Reinhard Kollak (28 March 1915 – 6 February 1980) was a Luftwaffe night fighter ace and recipient of the Knight's Cross of the Iron Cross during World War II. The Knight's Cross of the Iron Cross was awarded to recognise extreme battlefield bravery or successful military leadership.

Reinhard Kollak was the highest scoring non commissioned Nachtjagd pilot who, together with his Bordfunker Hans Herman, was credited with 49 victories in over 250 missions, all at night.

Career

Kollak was born in East Prussia, in March 1915 and began his military career by joining the Reichswehr. In 1935, Kollak was transferred to the Luftwaffe where he trained as a fighter pilot.
Upon completion of his training in the spring of 1940, Kollak was posted to the I./ZG 1 Zerstörergeschwader 1 and participated in the Battle of France and the Battle of Britain. In October 1940 Kollak was posted to the newly formed 1./NJG 1.

Night fighter career

Following the 1939 aerial Battle of the Heligoland Bight, the majority of RAF attacks shifted to the cover of darkness, initiating the Defence of the Reich campaign. By mid-1940, Generalmajor (Brigadier General) Josef Kammhuber had established a night air defense ground-controlled interception system (the Kammhuber Line). It consisted of a series of control sectors equipped with radars and searchlights and an associated night fighter. Each sector, named a Himmelbett ("canopy bed"), would direct the night fighter into visual range of target bombers. In 1941, the Luftwaffe started equipping night fighters with airborne radar such as the Lichtenstein radar. This airborne radar did not come into general use until early 1942.

Kollak claimed his first-night victory while flying as a Feldwebel with I. Gruppe of Nachtjagdgeschwader 1 (NJG 1—1st Night Fighter Wing), when he shot down an Armstrong Whitworth Whitley medium bomber in the early hours of 17 June 1941 in the vicinity of Hasselt. He remained with I./NJG 1 when it was redesignated 7./NJG 4 in May 1942 and on the night of 24/25 August 1942, shot down a Short Stirling heavy bomber as his tenth victory. He was awarded the German Cross in Gold on 12 April 1943. He received the Knight's Cross of the Iron Cross following his 29th aerial victory. The presentation was made by General Kammhuber on 29 August 1943 at the St. Trond airfield to both Kollak and Major Walter Ehle, the Gruppenkommandeur of II./NJG 1.

Kollak was the most successful pilot of III./NJG 4. Hans Herman joined the Luftwaffe in 1938 and served as Kollak's Bordfunker until the war's end.

Post war

After the war, Reinhard found it difficult to adjust to civilian life before he rejoined the newly founded Bundeswehr in 1956, and retired in 1967 as a Hauptfeldwebel. On 6 February 1980, he died at the age of 64.

Summary of career

Aerial victory claims
Foreman, Parry and Mathews, authors of Luftwaffe Night Fighter Claims 1939 – 1945, researched the German Federal Archives and found records for 49 nocturnal victory claims. Mathews and Foreman also published Luftwaffe Aces — Biographies and Victory Claims, also listing Kollak with 49 claims.

Awards
 Flugzeugführerabzeichen
 Front Flying Clasp of the Luftwaffe in Gold
 Iron Cross (1939) 2nd and 1st Class
 Honour Goblet of the Luftwaffe (Ehrenpokal der Luftwaffe) on 28 September 1941 as Oberfeldwebel and pilot
 German Cross in Gold on 12 April 1943 as Oberfeldwebel in the 7./Nachtjagdgeschwader 4
 Knight's Cross of the Iron Cross on 29 August 1943 as Oberfeldwebel and pilot in the 8./Nachtjagdgeschwader 4

Notes

References

Citations

Bibliography

 
 
 
 
 
 
 
 
 
 

1915 births
1980 deaths
People from Ostróda County
People from East Prussia
Luftwaffe pilots
German World War II flying aces
German Air Force personnel
Recipients of the Gold German Cross
Recipients of the Knight's Cross of the Iron Cross